Clarence Howe Thurber (September 19, 1888 – November 1, 1966) an American university administrator and college athletics coach.  He was the 19th head football coach at Wabash College in Crawfordsville, Indiana, serving for two seasons, from 1913 to 1914, compiling a record of 7–6–1.  Thurber was also the head basketball coach at Wabash from 1913 to 1915, tallying a mark of 18–7, and the head baseball coach there from 1914 to 1915, amassing a record of 11–13.  Thurber served as the president of the University of Redlands in Redlands, California from 1933 to 1938.  He died on November 1, 1966, in Pasadena, California, following a long illness.

Head coaching record

Football

References

External links
 

1888 births
1966 deaths
American football tackles
Heads of universities and colleges in the United States
Colgate Raiders football players
University of Redlands people
Wabash Little Giants baseball coaches
Wabash Little Giants basketball coaches
Wabash Little Giants football coaches
People from Brattleboro, Vermont
People from Guilford, Vermont
Players of American football from Vermont
20th-century American academics